KMFDM is an industrial music act, founded in 1984 by Sascha Konietzko in Hamburg, Germany.  Since then, KMFDM has performed in North America, Europe, Asia, and Australia.  KMFDM's earliest performances were as a local act in Hamburg.  Their first major tour was in support of Ministry in 1990.  Since then, KMFDM has headlined all of their tours, with support from bands such as Sister Machine Gun, Die Warzau, Chemlab, God Lives Underwater, DJ? Acucrack, and Army of the Universe.

The live-band lineup has changed constantly throughout the band's history, with front man Konietzko remaining the only constant on vocals, percussion, and programming.  Notable musicians who have contributed to live performances include En Esch, Raymond Watts, Günter Schulz, Chris Vrenna, Nivek Ogre, William Rieflin, Tim Sköld, and Lucia Cifarelli.

On July 12, 2015, Konietzko posted on their official Facebook page that the "Salvation Tour 2015" might be the band's last tour in the United States due to the high taxes the IRS impose to artists.

References

KMFDM
Concert tours